Isabel Cristina Zuleta López (born 12 April 1982) is a Colombian activist and politician. An outspoken advocate for environmental causes, women's rights, and human rights, she was director of the Living Rivers movement in Antioquia, and belongs to the Movement for Water and Life.

She was elected to the Colombian Senate as part of the Historic Pact coalition in the 2022 parliamentary election.

Early life and activism

Zuleta was born on 12 April 1982, in Ituango, Antioquia, where she lived until she was 14. She had to leave the municipality after receiving threats from paramilitary groups. She studied sociology and history at the University of Antioquia, and it was there that she began to take part in community groups of women victims of the armed conflict.

Zuleta was director of the Living Rivers movement in Antioquia. In 2008, various people and organizations learned of the intention of Empresas Públicas de Medellín (EPM) to build the country's largest hydroelectric plant in their municipality. These people opposed the Ituango Dam megaproject since they perceived that it would have negative environmental and social consequences, and they organized to prevent its construction. Zuleta was linked to this process when she was studying at the University of Antioquia.

Death threats
Zuleta's opposition to the Ituango Dam has led to her being the subject of surveillance, eavesdropping on her communications, and threats against her life. Some of the latter came directly from paramilitary groups.

Several members and leaders of the Living Rivers movement have been assassinated since the initiation of the Ituango Dam project.

Political career
In 2021, Zuleta received the endorsement of the Humane Colombia party to join the closed list of the Historic Pact coalition, for which she was elected to the Colombian Senate in the 2022 parliamentary election. She was selected vice president of the Senate's Fifth Commission.

Awards and recognition
Zuleta is well-known for being one of the biggest opponents of the Ituango Dam. She has appeared in various media, arguing against what for her is a project that violates the rights of communities and victims of enforced disappearances buried in the canyon.

Amnesty International has recognized her as an important defender of human rights and the Cauca River.

In 2021, the social psychologist Florence Thomas named Zuleta one of the country's 10 women of the year for her contribution to the lives of Colombian women.

References

External links

  

1982 births
21st-century Colombian women politicians
21st-century Colombian politicians
Colombian environmentalists
Colombian human rights activists
Colombian women environmentalists
Colombian women's rights activists
Living people
Members of the Senate of Colombia
People from Antioquia Department
University of Antioquia alumni